Yoon Suk-yeol (born 18 December 1960) is a South Korean politician who has been serving as the 13th and current president of South Korea since 2022. Prior to his presidency, he served as the prosecutor general of South Korea between 2019 and 2021.

Born in Seoul, Yoon attended Seoul National University. In his capacity as the chief of the Seoul Central District Prosecutor's Office, he played a key role in convicting former presidents Park Geun-hye and Lee Myung-bak for abuse of power. Yoon was appointed prosecutor general of South Korea by President Moon Jae-in in July 2019. During Yoon's leadership, the Supreme Prosecutor's Office conducted embattled investigations into Cho Kuk, an influential figure in President Moon's administration, that would lead to Cho's resignation. Yoon's clashes with the Moon administration until his resignation as prosecutor general in March 2021 led to his rise as a presidential candidate.

In June 2021, Yoon announced his candidacy in the 2022 South Korean presidential election. He joined the  People Power Party (PPP) in July, and won the PPP nomination in November. Considered conservative and economically liberal, Yoon ran on a platform promising economic deregulation and other measures such as abolishing the Ministry of Gender Equality and Family. Yoon narrowly defeated Democratic Party nominee Lee Jae-myung on 9 March 2022 and assumed office as president on 10 May 2022. During his presidency, Yoon has attempted to raise the maximum working hours, moved to repair ties with Japan, expanded military exercises with the U.S., and taken a harder line against North Korea.

Early life and education

Yoon was born in Bomun-dong, Seongbuk District, Seoul, in 1960 and raised in Yeonhui-dong, Seodaemun District. His father, Yoon Ki-jung, was born in Nonsan and is a professor emeritus of economics at Yonsei University and a full member of the National Academy of Sciences of the Republic of Korea. His mother, Choi Jeong-ja, was born in Gangneung and was a lecturer at Ewha Womans University before leaving the position after getting married.

Yoon attended Daegwang Elementary School and Joongrang Middle School, transferring to Choongam Middle School after finishing eighth grade. After graduating from Choongam High School, he studied law at Seoul National University. He is a colleague of Moon Kang-bae, a lawyer who described Yoon as an "extrovert and faithful" person. Shortly after the Gwangju Uprising, Yoon and his colleagues held a mock trial, where he acted as a prosecutor, demanding the death penalty for Chun Doo-hwan, the president of the republic. Following the mock trial, Yoon escaped to Gangwon Province.

Yoon was exempted in 1982 from national service due to anisometropia. Yoon later added that he was unable to obtain a driving licence because of the condition.

Yoon passed the first part of the bar exam in Year 4 of university but failed the second. He kept failing for the next nine years. He finally passed the bar in 1991, in the same graduating class as Democratic Party assemblyman and minister of justice Park Beom-kye.

Prosecutorial career

Early career
Yoon started his career at Daegu Public Prosecutor's Office in 1994. He headed the Special Branch and Central Investigation Department, both of which investigate corruption-related cases. In 1999, he arrested Assistant Commissioner Park Hui-won, who was involved in a corruption in spite of strong objections from bureaucrats in the Kim Dae-jung cabinet.

In January 2002, Yoon worked briefly as a lawyer at Bae, Kim & Lee but left as he felt that he was not suited to the position. Upon his return as a prosecutor, he prosecuted such pro-Roh Moo-hyun figures as Ahn Hee-jung and Kang Keum-won. In 2006, he apprehended Chung Mong-koo for his complicity in a slush fund case at Hyundai Motor Company. In 2008, he worked for the independent counsel team resolving the BBK incident related to President Lee Myung-bak.

In 2013, Yoon led a special investigation team that looked into the National Intelligence Service (NIS)'s involvement in the 2012 NIS public opinion manipulation scandal. Yoon sought the prosecution of the former head of the NIS, Won Sei-hoon for violating the Public Official Election Act. He accused Justice Minister Hwang Kyo-ahn of influencing his investigation. As a result, he was demoted from the Seoul prosecutors' office to the Daegu and Daejeon High Prosecutors' Office.

Yoon later became head of investigations in the special prosecutor team of Park Young-soo, which investigated allegations pertaining to the 2016 Choi Soon-sil scandal involving Choi, Samsung vice-chairman Lee Jae-yong and then-president Park Geun-hye, which led to the impeachment of the president in December 2016.

On 19 May 2017, the newly-elected president Moon Jae-in appointed Yoon as chief of the Seoul Central District Prosecutors' Office. The prosecution indicted two former presidents Lee Myung-bak and Park Geun-hye, three former NIS chiefs, former chief justice Yang Sung-tae and more than 100 other former officials and business executives under his tenure. Yoon also led an investigation into accounting fraud at Samsung.

Prosecutor general
On 17 June 2019, Yoon was nominated as prosecutor general, replacing Moon Moo-il. His nomination was welcomed by the ruling Democratic Party and the Party for Democracy and Peace, but was opposed by the Liberty Korea Party and the Bareunmirae Party. The minor party Justice Party remained neutral. On 16 July, he was officially appointed as the new prosecutor general and started his term nine days later. President Moon ordered him to be neutral, adding that any kind of corruption must be strictly investigated though it is related to the government.

During Yoon's leadership, the Supreme Prosecutor's Office launched investigations against Minister of Justice Cho Kuk, who was involved in various scandals. His decision to investigate Cho was welcomed by the conservative opposition but was condemned by the Democratic Party and its supporters.

After Choo Mi-ae was appointed the new minister of justice, she took an action against several prosecutors close to Yoon. Choo attributed her decision to Yoon's failure to submit a reorganization plan for his department, which she requested, but this was seen as retaliation by the Blue House for Cho Kuk's prosecution.

In April 2020, Democratic Party lawmakers again attacked Yoon and called on him to resign as the prosecution started investigations into election law violation cases involving both ruling and opposition politicians and also suspected election rigging of the Ulsan mayoral race for Mayor Song Cheol-ho in 2018 by senior secretaries at the Blue House.

Suspension and reinstatement
On 24 November 2020, Minister of Justice Choo Mi-ae suspended Yoon from his position, citing alleged ethical violations, abuse of power, and interference into investigations of his associates and family members. Yoon filed an injunction against the minister's suspension order, which was approved by the Seoul Administrative Court on 1 December, temporarily halting the suspension. On 16 December, the Ministry of Justice then imposed a two-month suspension on Yoon, accepting four of six major charges for disciplinary action. The decision was subsequently approved by President Moon. However on 24 December, following an injunction filed at the Seoul Administrative Court, the suspension was overturned as the court accepted Yoon's claim that the process to suspend him was unfair.

2022 presidential election

Yoon had been considered a potential presidential candidate for the 2022 presidential election since the aftermath of the Cho Kuk controversies, appearing as a significant candidate in general election opinion polls since at least January 2020. In a January 2021 poll including all possible presidential candidates, Yoon led as the most favored with 30.4 percent of the vote, more than the individual supports for the ruling Democratic Party frontrunners Lee Jae-myung and Lee Nak-yon.

On 4 March 2021, Yoon tendered his resignation as the prosecutor-general, which was accepted by President Moon. On 29 June 2021, Yoon officially announced his candidacy in the 2022 presidential election. On 12 July, he registered with the National Election Commission as an independent candidate.

On 30 July 2021, Yoon officially joined the conservative People Power Party, which is currently the main opposition party in South Korea. Prior to this Yoon had been a political independent, although his popular support came primarily from conservatives. Yoon was welcomed into the PPP by Choi Jae-hyung, a fellow 2022 presidential candidate, in a small public ceremony at the PPP headquarters located in Yeouido, Seoul. Choi was the former head of the Board of Audit and Inspection and had also just recently joined the PPP, officially having become a member on 15 July. Yoon's welcoming ceremony into the People Power Party notably did not include recently elected party leader Lee Jun-seok, who had been outside of Seoul at the time.

During the primary election period, Yoon came under criticism for several perceived gaffes and controversial statements. In July, Yoon advocated for a 120-hour work week while critiquing President Moon's policy of the 52-hour maximum work week. Yoon advocated deregulating food safety standards because, in his opinion, "poor people should be allowed to eat substandard food for lower prices", citing economist Milton Friedman's 1980 book Free to Choose: A Personal Statement as the inspiration for the idea. In August, Yoon stated that South Korea's recent feminist movement was a significant contributing factor to the issue of the nation's low birth rates. Later that same week, Yoon claimed during an interview with Busan Ilbo that there was "basically no radiation leak" from the Fukushima Daiichi nuclear disaster because "the reactors themselves didn't collapse."

On 2 September 2021, news website Newsverse reported that during his time as prosecutor general, Yoon had allegedly ordered a senior prosecutor Son Jun-sung and politician Kim Woong to file politically motivated criminal complaints against Democratic Party politicians ahead of the 2020 legislative elections in an attempt to sway the elections. In response to the allegations, an internal investigatory probe was launched by the Supreme Prosecutor's Office, and an investigation was launched by the recently formed Corruption Investigation Office for High-ranking Officials (CIO). Yoon denied the allegations and reported informant Cho Sung-eun and Director of the National Intellience Service Park Jie-won to the CIO.

In early September, support for PPP primary contender Hong Joon-pyo, who had been the nominee for PPP predecessor Liberty Korea Party in the 2017 presidential election, rose sharply in polls, which made Hong the most significant contender to Yoon since the beginning of the campaign cycle. A 6 September poll of contenders across all parties showed support for Hong at 13.6%, up from 4.2% a week earlier, behind Yoon who had support at 26.4%.

During primary debates amongst PPP presidential candidates, Yoon appeared to have the hanja character for "king" written on his left palm, a shamanist talisman for good luck. Yoon's primary opponents, including Hong Joon-pyo and Yoo Seong-min, criticized Yoon for using shamanist practices and made comparisons to the Choi Soon-sil scandal. In response to the criticism, Yoon stated that "a supporter drew that as a message of support, encouraging me to be confident like a 'king' during the debate", and that he had forgotten to wash the mark off.

In October, Yoon made complimentary remarks about former authoritarian military dictator of South Korea Chun Doo-hwan. The remarks came during a meeting with People Power Party officials in Busan, during which Yoon said that "many people still consider Chun as having done well in politics, except the military coup and the Gwangju Uprising", later adding that he believed even people in Honam, the geographic area including Gwangju, felt the same way. Chun Doo-hwan, a widely maligned figure in South Korea, was responsible for numerous human rights abuses, including the torture and killings of innocent civilians. Yoon apologized for these remarks. However, news media and members of the Democratic Party speculated that a picture he posted on Instagram and later deleted indicated that the apology was insincere. The photo was of him feeding an apple to his dog, where the Korean words for "apple" and "apology" (사과) are homonyms. Yoon later denied the alleged symbolism of the photo. Yoon again apologized for his remarks when he visited the May 18th National Cemetery in Gwangju on 10 November, although his visit was met by protesters.

On 5 November 2021, Yoon officially won the nomination of the People Power Party for the 2022 presidential election. The win came after Yoon fought off a surge in support for rival candidate Hong Joon-pyo in the latter weeks of the primary. The nomination resulted from a four-day period of voting by party members and the general public. Yoon Suk-yeol won 47.85% of the votes, a total of 347,963 votes, and of the remaining candidates Hong Joon-pyo won 41.50% of the votes, Yoo Seong-min won 7.47% of the votes, and Won Hee-ryong won 3.17% of the votes.

On 7 November 2021, Yoon stated that if elected president he would pardon former presidents Lee Myung-bak and Park Geun-hye, both of whom were serving lengthy prison sentences for corruption (Park Geun-hye was later pardoned by President Moon Jae-in on 24 December of that same year).

Yoon narrowly won the 2022 presidential election that took place on 9 March 2022. Democratic Party candidate Lee Jae-myung conceded defeat in the early hours of the following day. Yoon won 48.56% of the votes, while Lee Jae-Myung won 47.83% of the vote. Yoon's presidential election victory was by the closest margin in South Korean history.

Presidency (2022–present)

Relocation of presidential office

On 20 March 2022, he announced that he would establish his presidential office in the Ministry of National Defense building in Yongsan District, Seoul, instead of the Blue House, which was open to the public as a park on 10 May 2022. He would take office that day. This marked the end of the Blue House as the official presidential office and residence after 74 years.

Domestic policy

Economic policy 
In 2023, Yoon attempted to raise South Korea's maximum weekly working hours from 52 to 69. However, widespread backlash, especially from the youth, led him to order government agencies to reconsider the plan.

2022 police bureau proposal 
In late July 2022, Yoon proposed the creation of a "police bureau", in order to ensure greater government oversight of the police force. In response, several police officers protested, claiming the measure was a dictatorial measure to compromise the political neutrality of the police.

In response to the protests, Lee Sang-min, Yoon's Interior Minister, compared them to the 1979 Coup d'état of December Twelfth, though he later walked back the remarks. Yoon himself also criticised the protests, saying, "Like many, I am also deeply concerned about the collective protest of the police chiefs," and calling it a "serious breach" of police discipline. 

Following the protests, the presidential office threatened to punish police officers. Additional remarks by Yoon Hee-keun, President Yoon's choice as Commissioner General of the National Police Agency, suggesting that police should focus on wages rather than the establishment of a police bureau, further enflamed tensions.

2022 Seoul crowd crush 
On 29 October 2022, at least 158 people were crushed to death when a crowd surged in an alleyway during Halloween festivities in Seoul's Itaewon district. President Yoon declared a state of official national mourning.

Foreign policy 
During his tenure so far, Yoon has made 4 foreign trips. He has met with fellow leaders, such as during the NATO Summit Madrid 2022, becoming the first South Korean leader to do so. He also attended the UN General Assembly and Global Fund's Seventh Replenishment Conference in New York City; he met with U.S. President Joe Biden. During Yoon's tenure, he has experienced various diplomatic gaffes, primarily during foreign visits.

Nancy Pelosi's visit 
During US House Speaker Nancy Pelosi's visit to South Korea, part of a larger tour of Asia, on 4 August 2022, Yoon snubbed a meeting with her, stating that he wanted to enjoy his vacation.

Queen Elizabeth's funeral 
While in London for the funeral of Queen Elizabeth II, Yoon’s opponents accused him of disrespect when he missed the chance to view the queen’s coffin lying in state – which he blamed on traffic.

Live mic criticism of US Congress incident 
Yoon's People Power Party sued four senior executives of local broadcaster Munhwa Broadcasting Corporation, including MBC TV head Park Sung-je, on grounds of defamation after news outlets initially reported that he insulted the US Congress. On 21 September 2022, after chatting with US President Joe Biden outside the seventh Global Fund meeting in New York City, Yoon was filmed telling his aides and top diplomats, "Wouldn't [inaudible] lose face if these saekki do not pass it in the legislature?" Although the audio is hard to discern, MBC, who broke the story on air, determined in its subtitles that he said "Biden" in an apparent reference to the latter's bid to increase the American contribution to the Global Fund by $6 billion, an act that would require congressional approval. Yoon's office denies that he was talking about Biden or the US Congress. Instead, it claims that he was expressing concern that his country's opposition-controlled parliament would reject his plans for a $100 million contribution to the same fund, and his press secretary Kim Eun-hye suggested that the word he uttered was not "Biden", but "nallimyeon", a similar-sounding word that means "to blow or waste". The video swiftly went viral, having been viewed repeatedly by millions. The controversy has also brought press freedom in South Korea to the public eye over the PPP's civil conduct involving MBC, with some press freedom groups, including the International Federation of Journalists, criticizing the lawsuit as politically motivated. A poll of 1,002 adult Koreans found his approval rating falling to 27.7 percent, a 3.7 percent drop from three weeks before, and that the majority (61.2 percent) believed Yoon said "Biden" compared to the 26.9 percent who thought he said "nallimyeon", and another poll of 1,000 adult Koreans found an even greater majority (70.8 percent) who said that he should directly apologize for his profanity versus the 27.9 percent who said he did not need to apologize.The Korean Ministry of Foreign Affairs sued MBC 'to restore trust in diplomacy'. This has been likened to the oppression of journalists by the Lee Myung-bak government in the past.

Pro-Japanese colonialist controversy
Yoon Suk-yeol government does not seek direct compensation or apology from the Japanese government and companies for victims of forced labor, a war crime committed by the Empire of Japan government and Japanese companies during World War II, but instead expresses its stance to receive voluntary donations from South Korean companies through the foundation. (This is a solution to the 2018 South Korean Supreme Court ruling, which was one of the causes of the Japan-South Korea trade dispute, which demanded compensation from companies and the Japanese government for past war crimes against victims who were forcibly recruited by the Japanese Empire during World War II.) The Democratic Party of Korea (DPK) criticized this, saying, "It tramples on the victims and represents Japan's companies interests". The Justice Party (JP) also joined DPK in 'declarations of the state of affairs' (시국선언) to criticize the Yoon Suk-yeol government. As of March 2023, 11 of the 15 surviving victims opposed the Yoon Suk Yeoln government's solution and demanded direct compensation from the Japanese government and companies.

Yoon Suk-yeol's remarks at a commemorative event related to the Samiljeol (3.1 절 or 삼일절), 1 March 2023 caused a great controversy in South Korea. Samiljeol is celebrates Koreans' spirit of resistance to regain their identity from colonial Japan. Yoon Suk-yeol said, "Korea lost its national sovereignty and suffered because it was not properly prepared for historical changes in the world at the time, and we should reflect on this past.". The remarks drew criticism from liberals, progressives and some moderate conservatives in the South Korea as "Chinil" (친일), "colonialist historical perspective" (식민사관), and "pro-Japanese highly submissive diplomacy" (친일 굴종외교). Conservative Lee Un-ju criticized Yoon's remarks, saying, "It is destroyed national pride". The Kyunghyang Shinmun official article referred to his claim as "sophistry" (궤변), saying that President Yoon claims to be a cooperative partner even though Japan does not reflect on the past. The DPK and the JP also criticized his remarks in a strong tone.

When the South Korean president Yoon Suk-yeol visited Japan on March 17, 2023. Constitutional Democratic Party of Japan (CDP) leader Kenta Izumi, who asked Yoon about the Statue of Peace issue. The Statue of Peace is a symbol promoted by the South Korean government and South Korean civic groups to various countries to honor the victims of Comfort women, an example of Japanese war crimes. The CDP insists on removing the Statue of Peace. Kyunghyang Shinmun simultaneously criticized the Japanese people's historical revisionist perception and Yoon Suk-yeol's foreign policy toward Japan.

Public approval 
Less than three months into his presidency, Yoon's approval rating dropped to less than 30 percent amidst the 2021–2022 inflation surge, a controversial education policy rollout (including a proposal to lower the starting elementary school age from six to five), controversies over nepotism in personnel appointments, the police bureau proposal, and conflicts within Yoon's People Power Party. His popularity fell further to 19% in August. In December, Yoon's approval rating rose back to above 40% for the first time in five months.

Political positions

Yoon identifies himself as "conservative". Chung Doo-un, a former conservative member of parliament, has considered Yoon a conservative. Political commentator Chin Jung-kwon, called his political inclination "libertarianism". He has also been described as a social conservative. His critical attitude toward feminism, nationalist nature, hostile attitude toward the opposition and the liberal media, has led the media and experts to call him and his policies "K-Trumpism" (한국판 트럼프 or K-트럼프) and "far-right" (극우), allegations denied by him and his supporters.

Economics 
Yoon opposes economic interventionism by the government and is generally regarded as pro-business, and as a fiscal conservative. He has cited economist Milton Friedman and Friedman's 1980 book Free to Choose: A Personal Statement as a major influence on his belief in economic liberalism. According to the Center for Strategic and International Studies, Yoon will attempt to reduce dependence on China and promote supply chain resilience.

Gender equality policy 
President Yoon entered office with a pledge to abolish the Ministry of Gender Equality and Family. This measure came from the unique context of South Korea, where the gender conflict has become very intense. He announced that the new government would not address gender as a collective, but rather focus on and respond to specific individual issues.

As of May 2022, there were only three women among the State Councilors of the Yoon Suk-yeol government and only two women among the vice-ministerial level officials, so there is some criticism that the government lacks women's representation. In response to these criticisms, Yoon appointed Park Soon-ae as the Minister of Education and Kim Seung-hee as the Minister of Welfare, setting the ratio of female-to-male ministers in the cabinet to 30%. However, Park Soon-ae resigned on 5 August, just 34 days into her tenure; Yoon's approval rating had fallen from 30% to 24%, largely due to public backlash against Park's school reform plans.

Military 
He is a conservative nationalist and has expressed active support for the possibility of South Korea having indigenous nuclear weapons. The Carnegie Endowment for International Peace referred to his policy as "nuclear populism". Some research shows that nationalist attitudes and anti-American sentiment are prevalent among supporters of an indigenous nuclear arsenal.

On 22 September 2021, Yoon stated that he will ask that the United States redeploy tactical nuclear weapons in South Korea if there is a threat from North Korea. Nuclear weapons have not been deployed by the US in South Korea since the early 1990s, after an agreement with Russia and in an effort to ease tensions between North and South Korea. Speaking for the United States, U.S. Deputy Assistant Secretary of State for Japan and Korea Mark Lambert rejected Yoon's call for the re-nuclearization of South Korea and said the proposal was against U.S. policy.

On 12 November 2021, Yoon indicated that he would be open to more US THAAD missile deployments in South Korea.

Electoral history

Personal life
President Yoon has been married to Kim Keon-hee since 2012. His wife has stated that she prefers the term first spouse instead of the first lady.

Kim is the president of Covana Contents, a company that focuses on art exhibitions. Kim has faced an investigation that alleged the she had taken 'kickbacks' for hosting art exhibitions, in addition to reports that circulated in the South Korean media that she inflated her resume with connections to New York University Stern School of Business. She responded by offering a public apology.

Yoon is the fourth South Korean president who is a Catholic, after his previous predecessors Moon Jae-in, Kim Dae-jung and Roh Moo-hyun  (a lapsed Catholic). He was baptized with the Christian name Ambrose.

Notes

References

External links 
 
 

 
1960 births
20th-century South Korean lawyers
21st-century South Korean lawyers
21st-century South Korean politicians
Conservatism in South Korea
Living people
Male critics of feminism
National conservatism
People from Seoul
People Power Party (South Korea) politicians
Presidents of South Korea
Prosecutors General of South Korea
Right-libertarianism
Seoul National University School of Law alumni
South Korean anti-communists
South Korean anti-feminists
South Korean Roman Catholics
Papyeong Yun clan